Jhabrera is a town and a nagar panchayat in Hardwar district in the Indian state of Uttarakhand, situated 17 kilometres from Roorkee. It can be reached by taking a left turn before Ganga canal and while entering Manglaur town from Delhi.

Jhabreda state
The town gets its name from the former village of "Jhabar Hera", established by Rao Bahmal, a Gurjar chieftain and ‘zamindar’(Descendant Of Mahabali Jograj Singh Panwar commander of Sarvakhap who fought Timur Lung in 1398), during the reign of Mughal Emperor Shahjahan.

Demographics 
The Jhabrera census town is divided into 7 wards for which elections are held every 5 years. The Jhabrera Nagar Panchayat has population of 11,186 of which 5,909 are males while 5,277 are females as per report released by Census India 2011.

Population of Children with age of 0-6 is 1553 which is 13.88 % of total population of Jhabrera (NP). In Jhabrera Nagar Panchayat, Female Sex Ratio is of 893 against state average of 963. Moreover Child Sex Ratio in Jhabrera is around 825 compared to Uttarakhand state average of 890. Literacy rate of Jhabrera city is 77.85 % lower than state average of 78.82 %. In Jhabrera, Male literacy is around 84.88 % while female literacy rate is 70.08 %.

Town	Population 11,186

|titlebar=#Fcd116
|left1=Religion
|right1=Percent
|float=right
|bars=

}}

Administration 
Jhabrera Nagar Panchayat has total administration over 1,793 houses to which it supplies basic amenities like water and sewerage. It is also authorize to build roads within Nagar Panchayat limits and impose taxes on properties coming under its jurisdiction.

References

External links
 Jhabrara at wikimapia

Cities and towns in Haridwar district